Lucius David Syms-Greene (born Lucius David Syms Brian Lederman; 22 February 1921 – 7 April 2003), known as David Greene, was a British television and film director, and actor.

Early life and career
David Greene was born in Manchester, England, and originally trained as a journalist, working for the Walthamstow Guardian. In the Second World War he served in the merchant navy but was invalided out in 1941. He became Publicity Manager for the Everyman Theatre in London before deciding to become an actor. After training at RADA, he further perfected his craft at the renowned repertory theatre, the Oxford Playhouse, where he worked under the director Peter Ashmore. Greene began public performances in 1948, including roles at the Old Vic. He moved into British films in the same year, including some minor "classics" such as The Wooden Horse (1950).

In 1953 emigrated to Toronto, Canada, where he worked in television production with the CBC, including on the acclaimed 1956 television play Flight into Danger. He later moved on to Hollywood, California, United States. Most of his initial films as a director, however, were made and produced back in Britain, and it was only in the mid-1970s that he became firmly established in Hollywood as a filmmaker for television.

Personal life
Greene was married seven times: Margaret Lane (1941–48), Katharine Blake (1948–59), Eileen Grace Jack (1959–70), Thomasina Doreen Patricia Jones (1972–73), Vanessa Linsell (1975–81), Lauren Rickey Greene (1981–2001) and Kelly Greene (2003). Greene was divorced from five of his seven wives. His marriage to Thomasina ended in her death and his seventh ended in his own death of pancreatic cancer three days later. He had one child each with Vanessa Linsell, Thomasina Jones, Eileen Grace Jack and Katharine Blake.

He died aged 82 on 7 April 2003 of pancreatic cancer, in Ojai, California.

Selected filmography

Actor
 Daughter of Darkness (1948)
 The Small Voice (1948)
 The Golden Madonna (1949)
 The Wooden Horse (1950)
 Let's Have a Murder (1950)
 The Dark Light (1951)

Director (feature films)
 The Shuttered Room (1967)
 Sebastian (1968)
 The Strange Affair (1968)
 I Start Counting (1969)
 The People Next Door (1970)
 Madame Sin (1972)
 Godspell (1973) (nominated for the Golden Palm at the Cannes Film Festival)
 London Conspiracy (1974) (co-directed with James Hill; released in Italy)
 Gray Lady Down (1978)
 Hard Country (1981)

Director (television films and miniseries)
 Shane (1966), episodes The Great Invasion, Part 1-2 starring David Carradine, Constance Ford, and Bradford Dillman
 The People Next Door (1968), an episode of season 2 of CBS Playhouse, starring Eli Wallach and Julie Harris, which was subsequently refilmed as a theatrical release in 1970 (won Emmy Award for Outstanding Directorial Achievement in Drama)
 The Count of Monte Cristo (1975), starring Richard Chamberlain, Kate Nelligan and Tony Curtis
 Rich Man, Poor Man (1976), starring Nick Nolte and Ray Milland (won Emmy Award for Outstanding Directing in a Drama Series)
 Roots (1977), starring Lorne Greene and Maya Angelou (won Emmy Award for Outstanding Directing in a Drama Series, alongside Marvin J. Chomsky, John Erman and Gilbert Moses)
 The Trial of Lee Harvey Oswald (1977), starring Lorne Greene and Ben Gazzara
 Friendly Fire (1979), starring Carol Burnett (won Emmy for Outstanding Directing in a Limited Series or a Special)
 A Vacation in Hell (1979), starring Priscilla Barnes
 Rehearsal for Murder (1982), starring Robert Preston and Lynn Redgrave
 Murder Among Friends (1982), starring Sally Kellerman and Leslie Nielsen
 Fatal Vision (1984), starring Karl Malden and Eva Marie Saint
 The Guardian (1984), starring Martin Sheen and Louis Gossett Jr.
 Guilty Conscience (1985), starring Anthony Hopkins and Blythe Danner
 Circle of Violence (1986), starring Tuesday Weld and River Phoenix (won a Wise Owl Award for Outstanding Television Film)
 The Betty Ford Story (1987), starring Gena Rowlands and Josef Sommer
 Inherit the Wind (1988), starring Kirk Douglas and Jason Robards Jr.
 Liberace: Behind the Music (1988), starring Victor Garber
 Small Sacrifices (1989), starring Ryan O'Neal and Farrah Fawcett
 The Penthouse (1989), starring Robin Givens
 In the Best Interest of the Child (1990), starring Meg Tilly
 What Ever Happened to Baby Jane? (1991), starring the Redgrave sisters, Lynn and Vanessa, a remake of the 1962 film of the same name.
 Willing to Kill: The Texas Cheerleader Story (1992), starring Lesley Ann Warren and Dennis Christopher
 Children of the Dust (1995), starring Sidney Poitier
 A Season in Purgatory (1996), starring Patrick Dempsey
 Breach of Faith: A Family of Cops 2 (1997), starring Charles Bronson and Daniel Baldwin
 Bella Mafia (1997), starring Vanessa Redgrave, Nastassja Kinski, Jennifer Tilly and Dennis Farina

References

External links
 

1921 births
2003 deaths
English male film actors
English film directors
English television directors
Primetime Emmy Award winners
Deaths from pancreatic cancer
Deaths from cancer in California
Writers from Manchester
British Merchant Navy personnel of World War II
British emigrants to Canada
Canadian emigrants to the United States